Boris Groysberg (born December 4, 1971) is an American academic. He is the Richard P. Chapman Professor of Business Administration at Harvard Business School.

Early life
Boris Groysberg was born on December 4, 1971. He graduated from New York University in 1994. He earned a DBA from the Harvard Business School in 2002.

Career
Groysberg began his career at IBM. He later became the Richard P. Chapman Professor of Business Administration at the Harvard Business School. He also serves on the board of directors of the First Republic Bank.

Groysberg is the author of a book and co-author of two more books. His first book, Chasing Stars: The Myth of Talent and the Portability of Performance, is an analysis of the portability of star talent among investment bankers in New York City. In a review for the Administrative Science Quarterly, Alison Davis-Blake concluded that the book "combines the excitement of peeking inside the daily world of Wall Street investment bankers with careful statistical analyses and rich qualitative data to encourage the reader to think more deeply about whether hiring stars creates or destroys value for both stars and the firms that employ them." Reviewing it for Perspectives on Work, Matthew Bidwell noted that the book made an important contribution to the literature on HR systems and mobility, and he praised the "combination of quantitative and qualitative material", concluding that "The reader comes away with a deep understanding of what investment analysts do, how those analysts relate to others, how they are managed, and how they and firms think about careers."

Selected works

References

Living people
New York University alumni
Harvard Business School alumni
Harvard Business School faculty
1971 births